Benton Township is one of ten townships in Andrew County, Missouri, United States. As of the 2010 census, its population was 1,020.

The township was named after Thomas Hart Benton, a senator from Missouri.

Geography

The streams of Kellog Branch, Lower Neely Branch, Riggin Branch, Upper Neely Branch and White Cloud Creek run through this township.

Transportation
Benton Township contains one airport, Furst Landing Strip.

References

 USGS Geographic Names Information System (GNIS)

External links
 US-Counties.com
 City-Data.com

Townships in Andrew County, Missouri
Townships in Missouri